The following table represents laws in respective countries or jurisdictions which restrict the use of Email spam.

Note: Countries / Jurisdictions marked with red are listed in the Spamhaus' Worst Spam Origin Countries (March 2020).

See also 
 Email spam
 Spamming
 Coalition Against Unsolicited Commercial Email (CAUCE)
 List of countries by number of Internet users

References

External links 
 Piercing the Corporate Veil and Corporate Groups

Computer law
Spamming
Email
Statutory law